Madeleine is a station on lines 8, 12 and 14  of the Paris Métro in central Paris and the 8th arrondissement.

Location
The station is located under the Place de la Madeleine, the platforms being positioned:
 on line 8, east of the square and oriented approximately east-west, along the axis of Boulevard de la Madeleine (between Concorde and Opéra stations));
 on line 12, also east of the square and oriented approximately north-south, curved along the axis of the side carriageway of the said square on the one hand, and Rue Tronchet on the other hand, (between Saint-Lazare and Concorde);
 on line 14, northeast of the square and oriented approximately northwest/southeast, along the axis of Rue de Sèze (between Saint-Lazare and Pyramides).

History
The station was opened on 5 November 1910 as part of the original section of the Nord-Sud Company's line A between Porte de Versailles and Notre-Dame-de-Lorette.It is named after the nearby Église de la Madeleine, which was dedicated to Sainte Madeleine in the 18th century. A small settlement had grown up in the district by the 6th century around a stronghold of the Bishop of Paris. It was known from an early date as la Ville-l’Évêque ("Town of the Bishop").

The line 8 platforms opened on 13 July 1913 as part of the original section of the line between Beaugrenelle (now Charles Michels on line 10) and Opéra. On 27 March 1931 line A became line 12 of the Métro. The line 14 platforms opened on 15 October 1998 as part of the original section of the line between Madeleine and Bibliothèque François Mitterrand.  It was the north-western terminus of Line 14 until its extension to Saint-Lazare in 2003.

In 2020, with the Covid-19 crisis, 4,297,547 passengers entered this station, which places it in 25th position among metro stations for its attendance.

Passenger services

Access
The station has five accesses divided into seven metro entrances:
 access 1 -Place de la Madeleine, comprising a fixed staircase and a lift giving access to line 14, leading to the right of no. 22 of the place;
 access 2 - Eglise , consisting of a fixed staircase adorned with two atypical masts (indicating the existence of an underground passage by the double inscription PASSAGE PUBLIC - METRO), located opposite no. 16 of the Square de la Madeleine, at the corner with the same named boulevard;
 access 3 - Rue Duphot, consisting of a fixed staircase with a PASSAGE PUBLIC - METRO mast and an ascending escalator arranged back-to-back, located to the right of no. 23 Boulevard de la Madeleine, and communicating directly with the basement of the Decathlon store located at this address;
 access 4 - Rue de Sèze, consisting of a fixed staircase communicating with the underground car parks under the square, leading out opposite no. 2 rue Tronchet;
 access 5 - Rue Tronchet, consisting of a fixed staircase, located to the right of nos. 3 and 5 of this same street;

Station layout

Platforms
The platforms of the three lines are of standard configuration. Two in number per stopping point, they are separated by the metro tracks located in the center and the vault is elliptical.

On line 8, the decoration is in the Andreu-Motte style with two yellow light strips, benches and corridor outlets in flat yellow tiles and yellow Motte seats. However, the thresholds of the corridors allowing the connections with line 14 have a flat white tiling. These arrangements are combined with the same tiles that cover the side walls, the vault and the tunnel exits. The advertising frames are metallic and the name of the station is written in Parisine typeface on enamelled plates.

The platforms of line 12 are built in a curve and have a semi-elliptical vault, a shape specific to the old North-South stations. They are also furnished in the Andreu-Motte style with red strip light canopies, flat red tiled benches and red Motte seats. The outlets of the corridors are also covered in flat red tiling, except for those allowing connections with line 14 which are equipped either with flat white tiling, or with the marble characteristic of the corridors of this line. As with line 8, these fittings are combined with the flat white tiling on the side walls, the vault and the tunnel exits. The advertising frames are metallic and the name of the station is written in Parisine font on enamel plates.

The architecture of the line 14 station is contemporary and follows the principles defined by Bernard Kohn for the whole of this line in 1991, both in the choice of materials (vault in light concrete, marble side walls fitted with glass, tiled floor, wooden seats, etc.) As for lighting and ceiling height; the platforms are also wider than those of other lines. The name of the station appears in Parisine font on backlit panels embedded in the side walls and on stickers affixed to the platform facades.

In addition, the platforms of line 14 are sadly famous for the nauseating odour which reigns there due to the emanation of Hydrogen sulfide due to the poor sealing of the station.

Corridors
The connection between line 14 and line 8/12 is done via a large circular access shaft, with many escalators, which is the old TBM access shaft for the construction of the line up to Madeleine. This allows quick trips between platforms.

Cultural facilities
Three works of art are located in the corridors or on the platforms created for line 14, La Prière and Ryaba la Poule are in the connecting corridor with line 12 while Tissignalisation no 14] adorns the vault of the platforms.

La Prière is a sculpture created by Constantin Brâncuși. This work, a reproduction of the 1907 work, has been on display in the station since December 2001 and features a woman praying. Offered to France by the president of the International Franco-Romanian Foundation, the sculptor Remus Botar Botarro, to celebrate the 125th anniversary of the birth of Constantin Brâncuşi (1876-2001), this identical copy was made in the Noack art foundry in Berlin, in 2000, from a silicon rubber moulding.

“Everything contributes to it. The hole in the shadows of the eyes, the absence of particular features, its anonymous character, the suppression of useless details (the ears, the fingers), the slow and serious movement of the head, the hand, the shoulders, the amputation of the left forearm which would have hampered the almost ritual rhythm of the composition, the asymmetry of the legs, one being more advanced than the other, the tormented, harsh, fragmented moulding and above all the spiritual intensity, of this invisible that the artist makes visible through the animated form. To the emotional space of sculpture, Brâncuşi adds a new dimension: that of time, expressed by the continuous rhythm and by the march towards the human. A humanity seen in recollection and faith, a humanity animated by charity and nostalgia for heaven." (From Ionel Jianu, Modern Sculpture in France.)

Ryaba la Poule is a work by Russian artist Ivan Lubennikov. Installed in 2009, it is a 40m2 stained glass window made up of 20 panels inlaid with glass elements placed on the mezzanine access to the platforms, at the outlet of the connecting corridor with line 12. In exchange for this work, Ile-de-France transport provided the Moscow metro with a Guimard kiosk, installed at the entrance to Kievskaïa station on the Koltsevaïa11 line.

Tissignalisation no 14 is a work by the French artist Jacques Tissinier. Created at the same time as the station, it is installed on the vault. This is an installation using a thousand embedded discs in coloured enamelled steel. Each disc measures 16 cm in diameter and represents a stylized papyrus sheet coloured in red, white, blue and orange.

Bus connections
The station is served by lines 42, 45, 52, 84, 94 of the RATP Bus Network.

Nearby
 Église de la Madeleine, Place de la Madeleine
 Olympia
 Ministry of Justice
 Colonne Vendôme
 Théâtre de la Madeleine
 Théâtre Édouard VII
 Cour des comptes
 Pinacothèque de Paris

Gallery

Tenants
At one time Northwest Airlines had its Paris offices in the station.

References

Roland, Gérard (2003). Stations de métro. D’Abbesses à Wagram. Éditions Bonneton.

Accessible Paris Métro stations
Paris Métro stations in the 8th arrondissement of Paris
Railway stations in France opened in 1910